Lars Pontus Nyholm (born 10 February 1998) is a Swedish professional golfer. He joined the Korn Ferry Tour in 2022 and was runner-up at the Veritex Bank Championship. As an amateur, he won the 2016 Jacques Léglise Trophy and the 2019 European Amateur Team Championship, and played in the 2021 Arnold Palmer Cup.

Amateur career
Nyholm grew up in Gävle, where his father is a superintendent at the local golf course, and his father took him golfing as soon as he could walk. His swing coach is Kasper Hedblom, son of three-time European Tour winner Peter Hedblom.

As a junior, Nyholm won the 2015 Order of Merit on the Skandia Tour, an under-21 circuit in Sweden, and was runner-up in the 2015 Swedish Junior Matchplay Championship. In 2016, he won the tournament, and advanced to the round of 16 in the Boys Amateur Championship.

Nyholm appeared for the National Team at the Junior Golf World Cup in Japan and European Boys' Team Championship in 2016, and was a member of the winning Continental European Team in the Jacques Léglise Trophy against Great Britain and Ireland. He was part of the Swedish team, together with Albin Bergström, Vincent Norrman, Christoffer Pålsson, David Nyfjäll and Ludvig Åberg, winning the 2019 European Amateur Team Championship. he defeated Alex Fitzpatrick as Sweden defeated England in the final.

Nyholm accepted a scholarship to Campbell University and played with the Campbell Fighting Camels golf team 2017–2021. He was 2018 Big South Conference Freshman of the Year and qualified individually for the NCAA Championship. In 2021, he was Golfer of the Year after three first-place finishes and leading Campbell to a second-straight league title while rating first in stroke average (70.08).

He graduated in May 2021 as a business administration major, with the most top-10 individual finishes (21) and the lowest career stroke average (71.17) in school history. He was rated as high as No. 13 by Golfstat, No. 15 in PGA Tour University and No. 46 in World Amateur Golf Rankings. Nyholm earned a sponsor's exemption to Rex Hospital Open on the Korn Ferry Tour where he made the cut. He crowned his college career with a selection to play in the 2021 Arnold Palmer Cup with the international team.

Professional career
Nyholm turned professional after the European Amateur Team Championship in July 2021. He made a few starts on the Challenge Tour where he was tied 6th at the Finnish Challenge and tied 7th at the British Challenge.

In November 2021, Nyholm finished tied 29th at the Korn Ferry Tour Final Stage of Q-School to secure status for 2022. In his rookie season, he finished runner-up at the Veritex Bank Championship after matching the 18-hole tournament scoring record with a 9-under 62, totaling a 20-under 264 to finish two shots behind the champion.

Amateur wins
2016 Swedish Junior Matchplay Championship
2019 Intercollegiate at Innisbrook
2020 Golfweek True Blue Amateur
2021 Southern Invitational, Golfweek Spring Invitational, Stitch Intercollegiate

Source:

Professional wins (2)

Swedish Future Series wins (2)

Sources:

Team appearances
Amateur
Junior Golf World Cup (representing Sweden): 2016
Jacques Léglise Trophy (representing Continental Europe): 2016 (winners)
European Boys' Team Championship (representing Sweden): 2016
European Amateur Team Championship (representing Sweden): 2018, 2019 (winners), 2021
Arnold Palmer Cup (representing the International Team): 2021

Source:

References

External links

Swedish male golfers
Campbell Fighting Camels golfers
Sportspeople from Gävleborg County
People from Gävle
1998 births
Living people